The Men's 5,000 metres event at the 2003 Pan American Games took place on Tuesday August 5, 2003.

Medalists

Records

Results

Notes

See also
2003 World Championships in Athletics – Men's 5000 metres
Athletics at the 2004 Summer Olympics – Men's 5000 metres

References
Results
Records

5,000 metres, Men's
2003